Adil Najam is a Pakistani academic who serves as the inaugural dean of the Pardee School of Global Studies at Boston University, and previously served as vice-chancellor of the LUMS.

Life

In 2011, Najam returned to Pakistan to head the Lahore University of Management Sciences (LUMS) as its third vice-chancellor. During his tenure at LUMS, he oversaw the launch of a major student financial aid program and brought in major philanthropic gifts to enable an expansion of the university. However, he faced criticism for not intervening over the controversial termination of Pervez Hoodbhoy by the university's School of Science and Engineering. Najam left LUMS in June 2013, and returned to Boston University. A year later he was appointed the inaugural dean of Pardee School.

He was awarded Sitara-i-Imtiaz in 2008 by the President of Pakistan, and in February 2009, he was appointed to the Committee for Development Policy by the United Nations Secretary General. He is a senior fellow of the International Institute for Sustainable Development. He has also served as the Chair of the Boards of the South Asian Network for Development and Environmental Economics (SANDEE), of LEAD-Pakistan, and of the Luc Hoffmann Institute. He also serves as a Trustee on the International Board of the World Wide Fund for Nature and on the Board of The Asia Foundation. Adil Najam was awarded an honorary doctorate degree by the Information Technology University (ITU) in Lahore, Pakistan, in 2017, for his contributions in science, climate change, and sustainable development.

Publications

Scholarly work

He promotes the idea of living in the "Age of Adaptation" and conceptualizing water as being as important to climate adaptation as carbon was to mitigation.

Bibliography
His books include How Immigrants Impact their Homelands (co-editor, 2013), "The Future of South-South Economic Relations" (co-editor, 2012), "Envisioning a Sustainable Development Agenda for Trade and Environment" (co-editor, 2007), "Portrait of a Giving Community" (2007), "Environment, Development and Human Security" (editor, 2003), and "Civic Entrepreneurship" (co-author, 2002).

s of the Intergovernmental Panel on Climate Change (IPCC). The IPCC was awarded the 2007 Nobel Peace Prize for its contributions to advancing the understanding of global climate change.

Media
Early in his career Najam worked as a journalist (sports reporter and columnist) for various newspapers and magazines in Pakistan. He has contributed to newspapers in Pakistan and in the international press. In 2007 Najam launched the blog "All Things Pakistan (Pakistaniat)" which won the Brass Crescent Award for the best South Asian blog in 2010 and was judged the best current affairs blog by the Pakistan Blog Awards 2010.

References

External links 
 Frederick S. Pardee School of Global Studies, Boston University
 Boston University announcement of appointment of Dr. Adil Najam as Inaugural Dean of the Pardee School of Global Studies
 Outgoing VC of LUMS: A job well done
 Lahore University of Management Sciences (LUMS)
 Dean, Pardee School of Global Studies, Boston University
 International Institute for Sustainable Development staff page
 
 Boston Globe calls Najam Global Citizen
 Pakistaniat: All Things Pakistan blog
 Voice of Adil on National Public Radio (NPR)
 June 2007 Op-Ed on Climate Change in The Boston Globe
 December 2015 Op-Ed on Paris Climate Change Negotiations in The Guardian
 October 2016 Op-Ed on role of immigrants in USA's academic and Nobel Prize successes in The Conversation
 October 2016 Op-Ed on selection of new United Nations Secretary General in Time
 Adil Najam joins the WWF International Board of Trustees

Massachusetts Institute of Technology alumni
Boston University faculty
Pardee School of Global Studies faculty
The Fletcher School at Tufts University faculty
Punjabi academics
Pakistani scientists
Living people
University of Engineering and Technology, Lahore alumni
Pakistani emigrants to the United States
Vice-Chancellors of the Lahore University of Management Sciences
Recipients of Sitara-i-Imtiaz
The Asia Foundation
Year of birth missing (living people)
St. Patrick's High School, Karachi alumni